Faces is the tenth studio album by the American band Earth, Wind & Fire released on October 14, 1980, on ARC/Columbia Records. The album reached number 10 on the Billboard Top LPs chart, number 2 on the Billboard Top Soul albums chart and number 10 on the UK Albums Chart.
Faces was certified Gold in the US by the RIAA.

Overview
Faces was partly recorded in the Caribbean island of Montserrat and produced by EWF leader Maurice White.

Artists such as Fred Wesley and Toto's Steve Lukather guested on the album.

When asked in a 2007 interview which Earth, Wind & Fire album is his favorite, White replied, "...probably Faces, because we were really in tune." White also went on to proclaim that on the LP EWF were "playing together and it gave us the opportunity to explore new areas".

Singles
The track, "Let Me Talk", reached No. 8 on the Billboard R&B Singles chart and No. 29 on the UK Pop Singles chart. The song, "You", peaked at Nos. 10 and 30 on the Billboard R&B Singles and Adult Contemporary charts, respectively. A third single, "And Love Goes On", reached No. 15 on the Billboard R&B Singles chart.

Critical reception

Dennis Hunt of the Los Angeles Times declared "Faces is the R&B album of the year." Hunt added "Faces is expertly written, produced and performed and is considerably better than any of this year's hardcore R&B albums. Just about every song on "Faces," which is nearly all upbeat, is high quality. Its danceability rating is as high as any you'll find on an album in this post-disco era. Sparkle and Turn It Into Something Good are the best of this classy lot."

Nelson George of Musician stated "Faces re-affirms EW&F's role as the world's finest progressive soul band. While not an innovative work, the beauty of Faces is the band's feeling of renewed vigour and spirit, qualities that separate them from the many other good self-contained black bands".  Sal Caputo of Gannett said "Minus Earth Wind and Fire's peace, love and happiness hype, this is a very good dance album by a tight ensemble which occasionally wanders too far into pretension. The two-record set contains spots of jazz, classic-rhythm and blues harmonies, Latin rhythms, modern funk, rock and soul all mixed together in an attempt to create a sort of "world" music. The guiding philosophy seems to be that music can unite us all and give us strength."

Paul Sexton of Record Mirror gave the album a three out of five star rating and proclaimed "they're burning hot enough". Phyl Garland of Stereo Review wrote "Earth Wind & Fire's new release, the two -disc set "Faces," has all the impact of a live volcano, but, unlike natural eruptions, this one is carefully controlled and every stunning effect is meticulously calculated." Garland also added "all these forces might have gotten in each other's way and produced a monstrously cluttered set, but the way White has choreographed them everything fits together so well that the listener need only sit (or lie) back and enjoy."

The Aberdeen Press and Journal exclaimed "That supremely talented outfit, Earth, Wind & Fire, have produced anothermasterwork in "Faces" (CBS), a double album dedicated to human brotherhood and understanding". Richard Williams of The Times wrote "Earth, Wind & Fire are arguably the most popular soul band in the world and Faces, following the enormous successes of All n' All and I Am, will certainly reach their unusually broad market. The mixture is familiar: reassuringly melodic songs delivered by the outstanding falsetto of Philip Bailey and the plainer tenor of Maurice White with creamingly opulent arrangements featuring a hair-trigger rhythm section and flashy horns. Faces, is however, a two-record set and for all the brilliance of the playing and recording it is hard to sustain deep interest over the distance." Paul Willistein of The Morning Call wrote "this group's latest two-record set of 15 exceptional  funk, R&B and fusion numbers is simply exhilarating".

Elise Bretton of High Fidelity wrote "Soul Disco like April in Paris cannot be reprised. And when it is transcribed, no matter how accurately, no pianist I know would want to tackle all those syncopated eight and sixteenth notes while singing in the funky, get down style that makes Earth, Wind & Fire the nation's No. 1 nonet".

Bev Hillier of Smash Hits gave Faces an 8 out of 10 rating and found that "Their repertoire ranges from dreamy ballads through funk with a 
capital F, with numerous other styles incorporated en route. Every member's contribution is 
vital but Verdine White's bass in particular takes direct control of the feet and the horn section 
make Dexys sound like the Pied Piper. If you think disco's faceless, you ain't heard this". With a three out of four star rating Chuck Pratt of the Chicago Sun Times exclaimed "this fine funk soul group puts its best face forward on this ambitious and generous double pocket set of intricately produced, high gloss funk".

Isaac Hayes called Faces one of Earth, Wind & Fire's five essential recordings.
Music journalist Mike Freedberg also named Faces in his ballot for The Village Voice'''s 1980 Pazz & Jop critics poll.

Track listing

2010 Reissue (Bonus Tracks)

Columbia Masters Reissue

Charts
Albums

Singles

Certifications

Accolades
The information regarding accolades attributed to Faces'' is adapted from SoulTracks.com.

References 

1980 albums
Columbia Records albums
ARC Records albums
Earth, Wind & Fire albums
Albums produced by Maurice White